Planica 1966 was Janez Polda Memorial I international ski jumping competition on Srednja Bloudkova K90 hill, held on 7 March 1965 in Planica, PR Slovenia, FPR Yugoslavia. 5,000 people has gathered.

Schedule

Competitions

On 6 March 1965, official training was on schedule at K90, however it was canceled, due to heavy snow in last couple of days, hill wasn't ready.

On 7 March 1965, official international competition, first Janez Polda Memorial was on schedule in front of 5,000 people. There were 35 competitors from 8 countries: Yugoslavia, East Germany, West Germany, Italy, Bolgaria, Hungary, Soviet Union and Austria. Dieter Müller won the event with 83 and 85 metres.

Official results

Janez Polda Memorial I 
7 March 1965 – Srednja Bloudkova K90 – Two rounds

References

1965 in Yugoslav sport
1965 in ski jumping
1965 in Slovenia
Ski jumping competitions in Yugoslavia
International sports competitions hosted by Yugoslavia
Ski jumping competitions in Slovenia
International sports competitions hosted by Slovenia